Makeshift Feelgood is the second album by the English electronic dance music group X-Press 2. It features Tim DeLaughter from The Polyphonic Spree, Kurt Wagner from Lambchop, Anthony Roman from Radio 4, 1980s band Kissing the Pink, and, on the first single "Kill 100", Rob Harvey from English rock group The Music. The single reached #59 in the UK Singles Chart.

Track listing
"Witchi Tai To"
"Enjoy the Ride"
"Give It"
"Fellow Cutie"
"Don't Make Me Wait"
"Kill 100"
"17"
"Light My Soul"
"The Answer"
"Last Man"
"Makeshift Feelgood"

References

2006 albums
X-Press 2 albums